Neikarappatti is a census town in Salem district in the Indian state of Tamil Nadu.

Demographics
 India census, Neikarappatti had a population of 9912. Males constitute 51% of the population and females 49%. Neikarappatti has an average literacy rate of 53%, lower than the national average of 59.5%: male literacy is 63%, and female literacy is 42%. In Neikarappatti, 12% of the population is under 6 years of age.

References

Cities and towns in Salem district